Saverio Costanzo (born 28 September 1975) is an Italian film and television director.

Biography

Early life
Costanzo was born in Rome, the son of journalist and TV presenter Maurizio Costanzo and writer Flaminia Morandi, and the brother of writer/director Camilla Costanzo.

Career
His debut film was Private in 2004. In 2007, his second feature, In memoria di me, was presented at the 57th Berlin Film Festival. His 2010 film The Solitude of Prime Numbers was nominated for the Golden Lion at the 67th Venice International Film Festival. In 2013, he directed the TV series In Treatment.

His film Hungry Hearts was selected to compete for the Golden Lion at the 71st Venice International Film Festival.

In 2018, he directed and co-wrote the entire first season of My Brilliant Friend, an adaptation of Elena Ferrante's Neapolitan Novels.

His next film, Finalmente l'alba, was announced in August 2022, with production set to begin later that month.

Personal life
Costanzo is in a relationship with actress Alba Rohrwacher.

Filmography

Film
 Private (2004)
 In memoria di me (2007)
 The Solitude of Prime Numbers (2010)
 Hungry Hearts (2014)
 Finalmente l'alba (TBA)

Television
 In Treatment (2013–2014)
 My Brilliant Friend (since 2018)

References

External links
 

1975 births
Living people
Film directors from Rome
David di Donatello winners
Nastro d'Argento winners